Longwood is a city in Seminole County, Florida, United States. The population was 15,087 at the 2020 census. It is part of the Orlando–Kissimmee–Sanford, Florida Metropolitan Statistical Area.

History

With the advent of World War II, growth began to impact Longwood as military personnel flowed into the new Naval Air Station Sanford to the north and Orlando Army Air Base to the south. By the 1950s, NAS Sanford was being converted into a Master Jet Base for carrier-based heavy attack aircraft and, along with the re-designated Orlando Air Force Base and nearby Pinecastle AFB (later renamed McCoy AFB), saw even more military families renting or purchasing homes in and around Longwood. In 1960, Longwood Elementary School was constructed and opened inside the city limits. During the 1950s and 1960s, the city also boasted its own airport, a single runway grass airstrip used mainly by private airplanes. Longwood Airport was located on the west side of the city and on the north side of State Road 434, until it was closed and developed into tract housing that became The Woodlands subdivision in the mid-1960s.

In 1965, the city served as a film site and backdrop, representing a fictional south Florida town adjacent to a Seminole Indian tribe reservation in the Universal Studios movie Johnny Tiger. Released in 1966, the movie starred Robert Taylor, Geraldine Brooks and Chad Everett.

New economic and development opportunities were brought to the area in the 1960s and 1970s, fueled by both the military and the space industry, as newly arriving Longwood residents were employed at Martin-Marietta's new missile plant in Orlando; Naval Air Station Sanford; Orlando Air Force Base (redesignated Naval Training Center Orlando in 1969); and McCoy Air Force Base in Orlando; as well as Cape Canaveral Air Force Station; Patrick Air Force Base; and the NASA John F. Kennedy Space Center in Brevard County. The development and opening of Walt Disney World in October 1971, along with other tourist attractions and the high technology corridor of businesses, especially those engaged in the modeling, simulation and training (MS&T) industry and associated military training systems activities near Florida Technological University (FTU), now the University of Central Florida (UCF), fueled even further growth. Short-term economic downturns caused by the closure of NAS Sanford in 1968 and McCoy AFB in 1975 were offset with other economic growth across Central Florida during the 1970s and 1980s. As a result, Longwood developed into primarily a residential community for residents working elsewhere in Seminole County or in adjacent Orange County. By 2000, the city had taken significant steps to revitalize its downtown historic district, expanded its borders through annexation and in the process gained a resident population exceeding 13,700.

Geography

The city has had two of the oldest trees in America within its borders: The Senator and the remaining Lady Liberty.

Economy

Top employers

According to the city's 2020 Comprehensive Annual Financial Report, the top employers in the city are:

Demographics

At the 2020 census, there were 15,087 people and 5,697 households in the city. The racial makeup of the city was 78.5% White, 8.3% African American, 0.1% Native American, 2.7% Asian, 0.0% Pacific Islander, 0.3% from other races, and 6.7% from two or more races. Hispanic or Latino of any race were 19.2% of the population.

There were 5,697 households.

The median household income was $65,651.00.

Points of interest

 Bradlee-McIntyre House
 Longwood Hotel
 Longwood Historic District
 Longwood (SunRail station)
 Senator (tree)
 Wekiva Presbyterian Church

Schools

The city of Longwood's public schools are a part of Seminole County Public Schools. Longwood contains four public elementary schools (K–5), two public middle schools (6–8), and one public high school (9–12). Two additional high schools are located outside of Longwood, but draw some students from within the city limits.

Elementary schools (public)

 Longwood Elementary School (Closed in 2011, but reopened in the 2017–2018 school year)
 Sabal Point Elementary School
 Wekiva Elementary School
 Woodlands Elementary School

Middle schools (public)

 Milwee Middle School
 Rock Lake Middle School
 Teague Middle School (in Altamonte Springs)
 Greenwood Middle School (in Lake Mary)

High schools (public)

 Lyman High School
 Lake Mary High School (in Lake Mary)
 Lake Brantley High School (in Altamonte Springs)

Transportation

Major Roads
A small slice of Interstate 4 runs along the western city limits and includes a single exit for State Road 434, which bisects the city to its eastern boundary at US Highway 17/92.

Public Transit
 Lynx
 SunRail

Notable people

 Jared Bernhardt, wide receiver for the Atlanta Falcons
 Bishop Clint S. Brown, gospel musician and pastor
 Rusty Day. a singer with the band Cactus
 Peter Demens, co-owner first mill, built Orange Belt Railroad, co-founded St. Petersburg
 Mandy Moore, singer, songwriter, actress and voice actress
 Matt Morgan, former WWE and Impact Wrestling, current Mayor of Longwood.
 David Richardson, first openly gay member of Florida House of Representatives
 Phyllis Thaxter, actress
 Logan Warmoth, shortstop in the Toronto Blue Jays organization
 Graham Zusi, a United States men's national soccer team soccer player

References

External links

 City of Longwood (official site)
 Seminole County Convention and Visitors Bureau
 RICHES Historical Collection of Longwood

Cities in Seminole County, Florida
Greater Orlando
Cities in Florida